Kandrat Krapiva (5 March 1896 – 7 January 1991) was a Soviet and Belarusian writer, playwright, social activist, and literary critic. He was the winner of two Stalin Prizes in 1941 and 1951 and winner of the USSR State Prize in 1971. From 1950 he was a member of the Academy of Sciences of the Belorussian SSR. He was a writer for the magazine, "Połymia".

Krapiva served in the Tsarist army from 1915, the Red Army from 1920 to 1923, and was involved in the Soviet annexation of Western Belarus in 1939, the Winter War (1939-1940) and the German-Soviet War (1941–45). He began his literary career in 1922, writing fables, poems, narrative poems, and short stories. Among his notable short stories are The Nettle (1925), Fables (1927), Neighbors (1928), and Live Phenomena (1930). He published the novel The Miadzviedzičy in 1932. He was also a notable playwright, writing plays such as The Partisans (1937), a heroic drama, and He Who Laughs Last (1939), a comedy which earned him the Stalin Prize in 1941. Post-war plays include With the People (1948) and People and Devils (1958).

References

1896 births
1991 deaths
20th-century Belarusian writers
20th-century dramatists and playwrights
20th-century short story writers
People from Uzda District
People from Igumensky Uyezd
Belarusian State University alumni
Communist Party of the Soviet Union members
Members of the Supreme Soviet of the Byelorussian SSR (1947–1950)
Members of the Supreme Soviet of the Byelorussian SSR (1951–1954)
Members of the Supreme Soviet of the Byelorussian SSR (1955–1959)
Members of the Supreme Soviet of the Byelorussian SSR (1959–1962)
Members of the Supreme Soviet of the Byelorussian SSR (1962–1966)
Members of the Supreme Soviet of the Byelorussian SSR (1967–1970)
Members of the Supreme Soviet of the Byelorussian SSR (1971–1974)
Members of the Supreme Soviet of the Byelorussian SSR (1975–1979)
Members of the Supreme Soviet of the Byelorussian SSR (1980–1985)
Members of the Supreme Soviet of the Byelorussian SSR (1985–1990)
Heroes of Socialist Labour
Stalin Prize winners
People's Writers of the Byelorussian SSR
Recipients of the Byelorussian SSR State Prize
Recipients of the Order of Friendship of Peoples
Recipients of the Order of Lenin
Recipients of the Order of the Red Banner
Recipients of the Order of the Red Banner of Labour
Recipients of the Order of the Red Star
Recipients of the USSR State Prize
Male dramatists and playwrights
People of the Soviet invasion of Poland
Socialist realism writers
Belarusian dramatists and playwrights
Belarusian journalists
Belarusian male poets
Belarusian male short story writers
Belarusian male writers
Belarusian people of World War II
Belarusian screenwriters
Belarusian translators
Soviet dramatists and playwrights
Soviet journalists
Soviet male poets
Soviet male writers
Soviet military personnel of the Winter War
Soviet military personnel of World War II

Soviet screenwriters
Soviet short story writers
Soviet translators